Mervyn John Reginald "Curly" Anderson (4 April 1909 – 14 November 1971) was a member of the Queensland Legislative Assembly.

Biography
Anderson was born at Toowoomba, Queensland, the son of John Anderson and his wife Clara Jane (née Harrold). He was educated at Toowoomba State School and upon leaving he was a delivery boy for father's grocery store. He was next proprietor of a service station before being the managing director of Maranoa Transport Pty Ltd and chairman and director of Western Transport Pty Ltd.

On 17 January 1935 he married Ethel Roberts Nairne and together had two sons and one daughter. Anderson died suddenly at home in November 1971.

Public life
Anderson started off in politics as a councilor on the Drayton Shire Council before becoming an alderman on the Toowoomba City Council including being Mayor of Toowoomba from 1952 to 1958.

He then entered state politics by beating the former Deputy Premier of Queensland and the then leader of the Australian Labor Party in Queensland, Jack Duggan at the 1957 Queensland state election by winning the seat of Toowoomba for the Liberal Party. The seat of Toowoomba was abolished before the 1960 Queensland state election and Anderson then won the seat of Toowoomba East, holding it till his retirement from politics in 1966.

References

Members of the Queensland Legislative Assembly
1909 births
1971 deaths
Liberal Party of Australia members of the Parliament of Queensland
20th-century Australian politicians